Audrey Caroline Emerton, Baroness Emerton  (born 10 September 1935) is a former member of the House of Lords. She sat as a crossbencher.
  
Appointed a Dame Commander of the Order of the British Empire in the 1989 New Year Honours, she was created a life peer as Baroness Emerton, of Tunbridge Wells in the County of Kent and of Clerkenwell in the London Borough of Islington on 17 February 1997. She sat in the House of Lords until her retirement on 1 November 2019.

Career
She worked in the National Health Service as Chief Nursing Officer of South East Thames Regional Health Authority throughout the 1980s, and is chiefly remembered and honoured for leading the programme that replaced Darenth Park Hospital, a huge asylum for people with learning disabilities, which closed in August 1988.

Affiliations
Emerton was Chancellor and Chief Commander of St John Ambulance and a volunteer with the organization for more than 70 years. She submitted her resignation in January 2002, saying she did not wish to seek a further three years in the post when her period of office expired in June 2002 

She was elected Chairman of the charity Attend (formerly known as National Association of Hospital and Community Friends) in 2003. She retired as chairman in 2006 but was named vice-president, a position she still holds.

She served as chairman of the Brighton Health Care NHS Trust from 1994 to 2000: the Audrey Emerton Building, an educational facility of Brighton and Sussex University Hospitals NHS Trust, is named in her honour.

Arms

Honours
<div class="center">

 She is also a Fellow of the Royal College of Nursing giving her the Post Nominal Letters "FRCN" for Life.

References

1935 births
Living people
British nursing administrators
Crossbench life peers
Dames Commander of the Order of the British Empire
Dames Grand Cross of the Order of St John
Life peeresses created by Elizabeth II
Fellows of the Royal College of Nursing
People involved with mental health
Fellows of King's College London

British nurses